Juglans californica, the California black walnut, also called the California walnut, or the Southern California black walnut, is a large shrub or small tree (about 20–49 feet tall) of the walnut family, Juglandaceae, endemic to the Central Valley and the Coast Range valleys from Northern to Southern California.

Distribution
Juglans californica is generally found in the valleys and adjacent slopes of the California Coast Ranges, Transverse Ranges, and Peninsular Ranges. It grows as part of mixed woodlands, and also on slopes and in valleys wherever conditions are favorable. It is threatened by development and overgrazing. Some native stands remain in urban Los Angeles in the Santa Monica Mountains and Hollywood Hills. J. californica  grows in riparian woodlands, either in single species stands or mixed with California's oaks (Quercus spp.) and cottonwoods (Populus fremontii).

Description
Juglans californica can be either a large shrub with 1–5 trunks, or a small, single-trunked tree.  The main trunk can fork close to the ground, making it look like two trees that have grown together, then diverged.  It has thick bark, deeply channeled or furrowed at maturity.  It has large, pinnately compound leaves with 11–19 lanceolate leaflets with toothed margins and no hair in the vein angles. It has a small hard nut in a shallowly grooved, thick shell that is difficult to remove.

Uses

Food
The nuts are edible and are eaten by the Chumash Indians of the Channel Islands of California and Ventura County . They are not grown commercially as food.

Cultivation
Juglans californica is cultivated throughout California to support the walnut industry, used as a rootstock in English walnut orchards. It is also cultivated as an ornamental tree where it is planted in California native plant, xeriscape, and wildlife habitat gardens and natural landscaping in California, and in Hawaii.

Taxonomy
Some authorities (e.g. the California Native Plant Society) combine this species with Juglans hindsii.  On the other hand, a 2007 molecular analysis of the genus suggests J. californica is sister to the remaining black walnuts (section Rhysocaryon). This article follows the conventions of The Jepson Manual.

References

Further reading
Anderson, E. N. "Some preliminary observations on the California black walnut (Juglans californica)" in Fremontia: A Journal of the California Native Plant Society.  January 2002.

External links

Jepson Manual Treatment – Juglans californica
Ecology
Juglans californica – U.C. Photo gallery
Interactive Distribution Map for Juglans californica

californica
Endemic flora of California
Trees of the Southwestern United States
Natural history of the California chaparral and woodlands
Natural history of the California Coast Ranges
Natural history of the Central Valley (California)
Natural history of the Peninsular Ranges
Natural history of the San Francisco Bay Area
Natural history of the Santa Monica Mountains
Natural history of the Transverse Ranges
Trees of Mediterranean climate
Edible nuts and seeds
Plants used in Native American cuisine
Pre-Columbian California cuisine
Garden plants of North America
Drought-tolerant plants
Ornamental trees